Loran Donald Shields (born September 18, 1936) is an American academic. He was the President of California State University, Fullerton from 1971 to 1980, and of Southern Methodist University from 1980 to 1986.

Biography
Loran Donald Shields was born on September 18, 1936, in San Diego, California. He received a B.A. in chemistry from the University of California, Riverside, and a PhD from the University of California at Los Angeles in 1964. From 1963 to 1967, he taught in the Chemistry Department at California State University, Fullerton, at which time he became vice-president for Administration.  Shields is the coauthor with Robert L. Pecsok, Thomas Cairns, and Ian G. McWilliam of the book Modern Methods of Analytical Chemistry, which was published in 1976.

He served as the President of California State University, Fullerton from 1971 to 1980, until he took on the presidency of Southern Methodist University. He resigned in 1986 because of health issues, at the time of the Southern Methodist University football scandal.

At the time of his appointment to the presidency of California State University, Fullerton, he was the youngest president of a public college or university in the United States.

In 1974, President Gerald Ford appointed him to the National Science Board.  He served on the National Science Board from 1974 to 1980.  In 1989, he became the executive director of the California Council on Science and Technology, and remained in that position until 1995. He also served on the board of the Research Corporation for Science Advancement from 1983 to 1986, and on the National Commission for Cooperative Education.

References

Living people
1936 births
People from San Diego
University of California, Riverside alumni
University of California, Los Angeles alumni
California State University, Fullerton faculty
Presidents of Southern Methodist University
21st-century American chemists